Kisoro District is a district in the Western Region of Uganda. The town of Kisoro is the site of the district headquarters.

Education 
Metropolitan International University in a secular private university licensed and accredited by National Council for Higher Education in Uganda. It is located in Kisoro Municipality in South Western Uganda.

Location
Kisoro District is bordered by Kanungu District to the north, Kabale District to the east, Rwanda to the south, and the Democratic Republic of the Congo to the west.

Population
In 1991, the national population census estimated the district population at 186,870. The population was estimated at 220,300  during the 2002 national census. In 2012, the population was estimated at 254,300. The national population census on 27 August 2014, enumerated the district's population at 281,705 people.

Religion
As of September 2002, the religious affiliations of the district residents broke down as follows: Christianity - 95.8 percent, Islam - 0.8 percent, Other - 1.3 percent, None - 2.2 percent.

Tourist attractions

 Bwindi Impenetrable Forest National Park, one of only four national parks in the world where the African mountain gorilla can be observed in the wild.
 Mgahinga Gorilla National Park has mountain gorillas and covers three of the eight Virunga Volcanoes (Muhabura, Gahinga, and Sabyinyo) all of which lie on the Uganda-Rwanda border.

References

 
Kigezi sub-region
Western Region, Uganda
Districts of Uganda